Kieron Mark Richardson (born 12 January 1986) is an English actor and television presenter. He plays the role of Ste Hay in Hollyoaks, having previously appeared in Heartbeat as Ricky Smith. He won the British Soap Award for  Best Onscreen Partnership with Hollyoaks co-star Emmett J. Scanlan in 2013.

Life and career

Richardson was born in Eccles, Greater Manchester. After appearing briefly in Hollyoaks: In the City, he was offered the role of Ste Hay in the main series, Hollyoaks, where he initially appeared for 19 episodes. The character was written out of the show after stealing a car, which resulted in a crash and his character getting sent to prison. He returned to Hollyoaks on 25 September 2007, and has been a regular cast member since. Richardson has also made appearances in Holby City, Heartbeat and the feature film Fragments, as well as the pantomime Cinderella as Prince Charming at The Embassy Theatre, Skegness, in 2006. 

Richardson took part in 2010 series of ITV's Dancing on Ice and was paired with Brianne Delcourt. He reached the final, finishing in third place.

In 2011, Richardson and his Hollyoaks ex co-star Bronagh Waugh began presenting on radio station Gaydio.

Personal life
On 15 September 2010, Richardson stated on television programme This Morning that he is gay, and had accepted that at the age of 20. He was inspired to come out by Joe McElderry. In July 2014, Richardson received homophobic abuse via social networking site Twitter.

In April 2015, Richardson married his long-term partner Carl Hyland in a ceremony in the Peak District. In December 2016, Richardson announced they were expecting twins via surrogacy. They have twins born in 2017, a boy and girl.

Filmography

References

External links

 

1986 births
Living people
English male soap opera actors
People from Eccles, Greater Manchester
English gay actors
21st-century English male actors
20th-century LGBT people
21st-century LGBT people
Male actors from Salford